Caladenia lorea, commonly known as the blushing spider orchid, is a species of orchid endemic to the south-west of Western Australia. It has a single, hairy leaf and up to three cream, pink and red flowers and often hybridises with the white spider orchid (Caladenia longicauda) producing intermediate forms.

Description 
The lateral sepals and petals spread widely near their bases but turn downwards nearer their tips. Flowering occurs from August to early October. This species often hybridises with Caladenia longicauda producing a range of intermediate forms.

Taxonomy and naming 
Caladenia lorea was first described in 2001 by Stephen Hopper and Andrew Phillip Brown from a specimen collected in Cockleshell Gully near Jurien Bay and the description was published in Nuytsia. The specific epithet (lorea) is derived from the Latin word lorum meaning "strap" or "thong" referring to the long "clubs" on the sepals and petals.

Distribution and habitat 
Blushing spider orchid occurs between Yanchep and Leeman  with an isolated population south of Bunbury, in the Geraldton Sandplains, Jarrah Forest and Swan Coastal Plain biogeographic regions where it grows in areas that are wet in winter.

Conservation
Caladenia lorea is classified as "not threatened" by the Western Australian Government Department of Parks and Wildlife.

References

lorea
Orchids of Western Australia
Endemic orchids of Australia
Plants described in 2001
Endemic flora of Western Australia
Taxa named by Stephen Hopper